Prithivinagar is a village in Rudraprayag district, Uttarakhand, India.  It is situated on National Highway 109.

Villages in Rudraprayag district